Lumen (minor planet designation: 141 Lumen) is a carbonaceous asteroid from the intermediate asteroid belt, approximately 130 kilometers in diameter. It is an identified Eunomian interloper.

Description 

It was discovered on January 13, 1875, by the brothers Paul Henry and Prosper Henry, but Paul is the one who was given the credit for this discovery. It is named for Lumen: Récits de l'infini, a book by the astronomer Camille Flammarion.

Richard Binzel and Schelte Bus further added to the knowledge about this asteroid in a light-curve survey published in 2003. This project was known as Small Main-belt Asteroid Spectroscopic Survey, Phase II or SMASSII, which built on a previous survey of the main-belt asteroids. The visible-wavelength (0.435–0.925 micrometre) spectra data was gathered between August 1993 and March 1999.

Lightcurve data has also been recorded by observers at the Antelope Hill Observatory, which has been designated as an official observatory by the Minor Planet Center.

References

External links
 Lightcurve plot of (141) Lumen, Antelope Hills Observatory
 
 

000141
000141
Discoveries by Paul Henry and Prosper Henry
Named minor planets
000141
000141
18750113